Komodo vs. Cobra, also referred to as KVC, is a 2005 American television film directed by Jim Wynorski. It is Wynorski's sequel to his 2004 film Curse of the Komodo, with several similar elements (experimentation gone awry, father-daughter team, government attempt to bomb things, the ending, Komodo's behaviors, etc.).

Wynroski says the first film "all turned out rather fun; so much so that they asked me to do a sequel. I said I would do it provided they sent myself and the entire cast to Hawaii to film it…which they did."

Plot
A team of environmentalists, including a reporter, her camera man, and an environmentalist's famous girlfriend charter a boat and with the captain, sail to a military island. They suspect the island is hosting to illegal activities.  Upon arrival, however, they find no one. They finally reach a deserted house, where they are confronted Dr. Susan Richardson, who tells them that everyone on the island is dead, including her father. Richardson's team were working on a compound that could make edible plants grow to super size, however the military intervened with plans of their own. They wanted to test the compound's effects on animals, and proceeded to feed it to several Komodo dragons and cobras.

As a result, both species grows to an enormous size and begins to devour everything on the island, including the humans. The group, the doctor, and the boat captain must escape the island, while avoiding Cobra and Komodo. The military finds out that some problems are happening on the island, so they send in troops. One by one the troops are killed by Komodo.

Meanwhile, the group try to escape to the lab, barely escaping both Cobra and Komodo. One environmentalist is killed, and the camera man. In the lab, Richardson tells her flashback of how the military messed things up. Now just wanting to escape the island alive, the group try to get back to the beach. On the beach they try to get to the yacht, but the military drop a bomb on it.  Then a cobra comes out the water and eats two more men. The remainder of the group decide to head for a helicopter that was left behind on a mountain by the doctor's father and team. While trying to cross a river to the mountain, one environmentalist is bitten by huge leeches. That is when Dr. Richardson announces that anything that comes into contact with the animal DNA (like saliva) can turn into a huge version of its kind. On the mountaintop, the remaining five run into Komodo, who is blocking the helicopter, the Komodo notices them and begins to attack. Soon, Cobra arrives. The man who was attacked by the leeches weakly makes himself bait. With bullets not penetrating Cobra's skin, only making the giant monster he is devoured.

The military sees footage of the demonic Komodo dragons and the yacht (meaning trespassers) decides to bomb the island, with the Americans still on it.

Soon, Komodo and Cobra begin to fight each other. The boat driver, a retired pilot in air force, flies the three remaining women away. Both Komodo and Cobra are killed in a military bombing on the island, still in mid-battle.

At the end of the film, a scientist, Dr. Michaels, who has escaped the Komodo, reawakens from the dead with reptilian characteristics, such as glowing green eyes and a forked tongue, revealing he is transforming into a Komodo dragon.

Cast
 Michael Paré as Mike A. Stoddard
 Michelle Borth as Dr. Susan Richardson
 Ryan McTavish as Jerry Ryan
 Renee Talbert as Carrie Evans
 Jerri Manthey as Sandra Crescent
 Ted Monte as Ted Marks
 Glori-Anne Gilbert as Darla Marks
 René Rivera as Dirk Preston
 Jay Richardson as Dr. William Richardson
 Rod McCary as General Bradley
 Roark Critchlow as Major Garber
 Paul Logan as Major Frank
 Damian T. Raven as Weeks
 Chris Neville as Lerner
 Del Wills as Marsden
 Mark Mahon as Patterson
 Paul Green as Monroe
 Jordon Krain as Dr. Rhodes
 Dan Golden as Dr. Michaels

Home Media
The film was released on DVD on July 25, 2006, by Lionsgate.

References

External links

2005 television films
2005 films
CineTel Films films
Films directed by Jim Wynorski
Syfy original films
Films about snakes
Giant monster films
American natural horror films
American independent films
2000s monster movies
Films about lizards
Films set on islands
American monster movies
American horror television films
2000s American films